The Young Lieutenant is a 2005 French crime drama film directed by Xavier Beauvois. With almost documentary realism, it shows how in a tragic breach of procedure a young married police lieutenant is killed by a suspect and how the head of his squad doggedly tracks down the killer, who is shot dead trying to escape.

Plot
Graduating from police academy as a lieutenant, Antoine chooses a place on a detective squad in a busy quarter of Paris, leaving his young wife in their home town of Le Havre. Newly in charge of the squad is Caroline who, after losing her young son to meningitis, took to the bottle. Now on her own and recovering, she takes an interest in her keen young assistant and in a quiet moment the two even share a joint.

Two similar incidents are under investigation, involving a Polish man and an English man being beaten, knifed, and thrown into the river. The first man dies but a witness says the assailant was a Russian, while the second man survives and can confirm that it was a Russian. After detective work has narrowed down a possible address for a prime suspect, Antoine and a colleague go to investigate. When the colleague says he needs to go to the toilet in a bar opposite, Antoine proceeds alone and is knifed to death.

Caroline is mortified by the failure of her squad and the loss of a valuable young recruit, while the colleague is sacked. After a bad evening when she buys herself gin and goes to the home of an ex-lover, she recovers her energy and her determination to catch the killer. Long detective work identifies an associate, who is arrested and his mobile phone is monitored. Calls from the killer reveal that he is in Nice. Flying there, Caroline watches the local police storm the building. When the killer leaps from a window, with two shots of her pistol Caroline kills him.

Cast
 Jalil Lespert as Antoine Derouère
 Nathalie Baye as Caroline Vaudieu
 Antoine Chappey as Louis Mallet
 Xavier Beauvois as Nicolas Morbe
 Jacques Perrin as Clermont
 Roschdy Zem as Solo
 Riton Liebman as Jean

Critical response 
The Young Lieutenant received generally positive reviews from critics. Review aggregation website Rotten Tomatoes reported an approval rating of 79%, based on 53 reviews, with an average rating of 6.9/10. The site's consensus reads, "A gritty, languidly paced crime drama that blends old-fashioned ambiance with modern cynicism". At Metacritic, which assigns a normalized rating out of 100 to reviews from mainstream critics, the film received an average score of 71, based on 19 reviews, indicating "generally favorable reviews".

Awards and nominations
César Awards (France)
Won: Best Actress – Leading Role (Nathalie Baye)
Nominated: Best Actor – Supporting Role (Roschdy Zem)
Nominated: Best Director
Nominated: Best Film
Nominated: Best Writing (Xavier Beauvois, Guillaume Bréaud and Jean-Eric Troubat)
European Film Awards 
Nominated: Best Actress – Leading Role (Nathalie Baye)
Venice Film Festival (Italy)
Won: Label Europa Cinemas (Xavier Beauvois)

References

External links
 
 Le petit lieutenant at the 2nd edition of Venice Days (62nd Venice International Film Festival)

2000s French-language films
2005 crime drama films
2005 films
Films featuring a Best Actress César Award-winning performance
Films directed by Xavier Beauvois
French crime drama films
2000s French films